Peter Stone is an American computer scientist who is the David Bruton Jr. Centennial Professor of Computer Science at the University of Texas at Austin. He is also an Alfred P. Sloan Research Fellow, Guggenheim Fellow, AAAI Fellow, and Fulbright Scholar.

Educational background

He received his Ph.D. in 1998 and his M.S. in 1995 from Carnegie Mellon University, both in Computer Science.  He received his B.S. in Mathematics from the University of Chicago in 1993.

Career
Stone continued at Carnegie Mellon as a Postdoctoral Fellow for one year.  From 1999 to 2002 he was a Senior
Technical Staff Member in the Artificial Intelligence Principles Research Department at AT&T Labs - Research.  He then joined the faculty of Computer Science Department at the University of Texas at Austin as an assistant professor.  He was promoted to associate professor in 2007 and full professor in 2012.  Stone was an adjunct professor at NYU in AY 2001-02, and a visiting professor at Hebrew University and Bar Ilan University in AY 2008-09.

Stone co-authored the papers that first proposed the robot soccer challenges around which Robocup was founded. He is President of the international RoboCup Federation since July 2019 and was a co-chair of RoboCup-2001 at IJCAI-01. Peter Stone was a Program Co-Chair of AAMAS 2006, was General Co-Chair of AAMAS 2011, and was a Program Co-Chair of AAAI-14.  He has developed teams of robot soccer agents that have won RoboCup championships in the simulation (1998, 1999, 2003, 2005, 2011, 2012, 2014, 2015, 2016, 2017), in the standard platform (2012) and in the small-wheeled robot (1997, 1998) leagues.  He has also developed agents that have won auction trading agents competitions (2000, 2001, 2003, 2005, 2006, 2008, 2009, 2010, 2011, 2013).

Research
Stone describes his research interest as understanding how we can best create complete intelligent agents. His research focuses mainly on machine learning, multiagent systems, and robotics. Application domains have included robot soccer, autonomous bidding agents, autonomous vehicles, autonomic computing, and social agents.

Honors and awards

 1997, Allen Newell Medal for Excellence in Research
 2003, CAREER award from the National Science Foundation for his research on learning agents in dynamic, collaborative, and adversarial multiagent environments.
 2004, named an ONR Young Investigator for his research on machine learning on physical robots.
 2007, awarded the prestigious IJCAI Computers and Thought Award, given once every two years to the top AI researcher under the age of 35.
 2008, Fulbright Award
 2008, Guggenheim Fellow
 2012, AAAI Fellow, Association for the Advancement of Artificial Intelligence
 2013, awarded the University of Texas System Regents' Outstanding Teaching Award.
 2014, inducted into the UT Austin Academy of Distinguished Teachers

References

External links

1971 births
Living people
American computer scientists
Artificial intelligence researchers
Carnegie Mellon University alumni
University of Texas faculty
Fellows of the Association for the Advancement of Artificial Intelligence
Sloan Research Fellows